The 2011 Erie Explosion season was the 5th season for the Southern Indoor Football League (SIFL) franchise.

On December 3, 2010, the team announced its new identity as the Erie Explosion, including a new logo, but retaining the same color scheme as the Storm previously had. After dealing with the legalities of the previous name, the ownership of the Explosion have secured the legal trademark of the new name, ensuring that this will be the last re-brand in the foreseeable future. The Erie Explosion was also one of 6 AIFA teams which were merged with the Southern Indoor Football League (SIFL) prior to the 2011 season. The Explosion announced the signing of Quarterback, Adam DiMichele, along with former local Erie Strong Vincent star, Maurice Williams, and college star receiver David Ball.

On May 21, 2011, the Explosion set a single-game franchise record, including an unofficial indoor football record, for the most points scored in a 138-0 blowout win over the Fayetteville Force after the Force was forced to restock its team with scrubs in an ownership change. The margin of victory is the third-highest in all of professional football, and the highest in over 100 years: only the 1903 Massillon Tigers (who won a game 148-0) and 1904 Watertown Red & Black (who won a game 142-0) have had wider margins of victory.

The Explosion finished the season with a 9–4 record, winning the Northeast Division, but were defeated 68–43 by the Albany Panthers in the first round of the playoffs. Despite the playoff loss, DiMichele was named SIFL MVP, finishing the season with 91 touchdown passes.

Roster

Schedule

Regular season

Postseason

Standings

 Green indicates clinched playoff berth
 Purple indicates division champion
 Grey indicates best league record
 * = Failed to make the playoffs despite winning division
 ** = Folded five games into their season.
 *** = Suspended operations prior to the season due to lack of Worker's Compensation Insurance

References

Erie Explosion
Erie Explosion seasons
2011 in sports in Pennsylvania